Puncticorpus is a genus of flies belonging to the family Lesser Dung flies.

Species
P. cribratum (Villeneuve, 1918)
P. lusitanicum (Richards, 1963)
P. susannae Papp, 1974

References

Sphaeroceridae
Diptera of Asia
Diptera of Europe
Sphaeroceroidea genera
Taxa named by Oswald Duda